This is a list of candidates of the 1991 New South Wales state election. The election was held on 25 May 1991.

Retiring Members

Labor
 Bob Christie MLA (Seven Hills)
 Michael Cleary MLA (Coogee)
 Merv Hunter MLA (Lake Macquarie)
 Bill Lovelee MLA (Bass Hill)
 Harry Moore MLA (Wyong)
 Barrie Unsworth MLA (Rockdale)
 Allan Walsh MLA (Maitland)
 George Brenner MLC
 Barney French MLC
 Fred Hankinson MLC
 Mick Ibbett MLC
 Ken Reed MLC

Liberal
 John Booth MLA (Wakehurst)
 John Dowd MLA (Lane Cove)
 Neil Pickard MLA (Hornsby)
 Guy Yeomans MLA (Hurstville)
 John Matthews MLC

National
 Noel Park MLA (Tamworth)
 Roger Wotton MLA (Castlereagh)
 Jack Doohan MLC
 Judy Jakins MLC
 Richard Killen MLC

Independent
 Marie Bignold MLC — elected as Call to Australia

Notes

Legislative Assembly
Sitting members are shown in bold text. Successful candidates are highlighted in the relevant colour. Where there is possible confusion, an asterisk (*) is also used.

Legislative Council
Sitting members are shown in bold text. Tickets that elected at least one MLC are highlighted in the relevant colour. Successful candidates are identified by an asterisk (*).

See also
 Members of the New South Wales Legislative Assembly, 1991–1995
 Members of the New South Wales Legislative Council, 1991–1995

References
 
 Green, Antony. Changing Boundaries, Changing Fortunes: an analysis of the NSW Elections of 1988 and 1991, New South Wales Parliamentary Library Research Service

1991